Rexville is an unincorporated community in Shelby Township, Ripley County, in the U.S. state of Indiana.

History
A post office was established at Rexville in 1870, and remained in operation until 1907. The community's name honors the Rex family of settlers.

Geography

References

Unincorporated communities in Ripley County, Indiana
Unincorporated communities in Indiana